Beech River Regional Airport  is a public-use airport in Henderson County, Tennessee, United States. It is located five nautical miles (5.8 mi, 9.3 km) northwest of the central business district of Parsons, a city in Decatur County.

The airport opened in 2006 and is owned by Beech River Regional Airport Authority, representing the cities of Lexington and Parsons, the counties of Henderson and Decatur, and the state of Tennessee. It is included in the FAA's National Plan of Integrated Airport Systems for 2011–2015, which categorized it as a general aviation facility.

Although many U.S. airports use the same three-letter location identifier for the FAA and IATA, this facility is assigned PVE by the FAA but has no designation from the IATA, which assigned PVE to El Porvenir, Panama.

Facilities and aircraft 
It has one runway designated 1/19 with a concrete surface measuring 6,000 by 100 feet (1,829 x 30 m).

For the 12-month period ending August 31, 2010, the airport had 3,440 aircraft operations, an average of 286 per month: 93% general aviation, 6% air taxi, and 1% military. At that time there were 26 aircraft based at this airport: 73% single-engine, 15% multi-engine and 13% jet.

The airport is attended during regular business hours and has 100LL avgas and Jet A fuel services.  It is included under the Jackson FSS.  It has runway lighting and PAPI on both runways, and is lighted sunset to sunrise. NOTAMs are filed with McKellar-Sipes Regional Airport. PVE is located on the Memphis sectional chart.

See also 
 List of airports in Tennessee

References

External links 
 Beech River Regional Airport, official site
 
 

Airports in Tennessee
Buildings and structures in Henderson County, Tennessee
Transportation in Henderson County, Tennessee